Konrad Grob (3 September 1828 – 9 January 1904) was a Swiss painter.

He was born in Andelfingen in the Canton of Zurich and learned lithography in the 1840s in Winterthur. He travelled to Italy, where he worked in Verona and Naples.

In 1865–1870, he studied painting at the Academy of Fine Arts, Munich where he graduated under Arthur von Ramberg. In Munich, he opened his own atelier and where he died in. He was specialized in romantic paintings of rural life. His best known painting is Pestalozzi bei den Waisen von Stans, shown today in the Öffentliche Kunstsammlung (the Museum of Art) of Basel.

References

External links
 
 
 

19th-century Swiss painters
Swiss male painters
Swiss lithographers
1828 births
1904 deaths
19th-century Swiss male artists